Pachynemertidae is a family of worms belonging to the order Polystilifera.

Genera:
 Pachinemertes
  Pachynemertes Coe, 1936

References

Polystilifera
Nemertea families